The Roman Catholic Diocese of La Crosse is a Roman Catholic diocese  (Roman Rite) of the Catholic Church encompassing the city of La Crosse and 19 counties: Adams, Buffalo, Chippewa, Clark, Crawford, Dunn, Eau Claire, Jackson, Juneau, La Crosse, Marathon, Monroe, Pepin, Pierce, Portage, Richland, Trempealeau, Vernon, and Wood counties in west-central Wisconsin, United States.  The Metropolitan for the diocese is the Archdiocese of Milwaukee. The mother church is the Cathedral of Saint Joseph the Workman.

History

Pope Pius IX erected the Diocese of La Crosse on March 3, 1868, with territory that was taken from the Diocese of Milwaukee.  It included the part of Wisconsin lying north and west of the Wisconsin River. Michael Heiss, then rector of St. Francis Seminary, Milwaukee, was named the first bishop of the new episcopal see.  At that time, there were 22 priests who cared for 23 churches and about 50 stations. Along with the English and German congregations, provisions were also made for Poles and Italians. Franciscan sisters and lay teachers were in charge of six parish schools. During the twelve years of his administration in La Crosse, Bishop Michael  Heiss built several churches, including the cathedral, and the episcopal residence. On March 14, 1880, he was appointed coadjutor bishop with right of succession to the Archbishop of Milwaukee, and succeeded, September 7, 1881. He died at La Crosse, March 26, 1890.

Kilian Flasch, second bishop, was born at Retzstadt, Bavaria, July 16, 1837, immigrated when he was ten years old, and settled near Milwaukee. He was selected as the successor of Bishop Heiss and consecrated Bishop of La Crosse, August 24, 1881. During his administration of ten years, he worked to increase the churches and the schools of the diocese, dying after a long illness on August 3, 1891.

James Schwebach, his vicar general, succeeded him as the third bishop, and was consecrated, February 25, 1892.

On May 3, 1905, Pope Pius X erected the Diocese of Superior with territory taken from the Diocese of La Crosse and the Diocese of Green Bay.

Father Solanus Casey, of the Capuchin religious order, was declared venerable by Pope John Paul II in 1995. He was born in Pierce County, Wisconsin, which is part of the Diocese of La Crosse.

On January 9, 1946, territory from the Dioceses of La Crosse and Green Bay and the Archdiocese of Milwaukee was removed to form the Diocese of Madison.

Raymond Leo Burke succeeded Bishop John Joseph Paul in 1994. In 2006, Bishop Jerome Listecki succeeded Burke as La Crosse's bishop; Burke became the Archbishop of St. Louis, Missouri and later the Prefect of the Supreme Tribunal of the Apostolic Signatura, the Vatican's highest court.

On November 14, 2009, Bishop Listecki was appointed Archbishop of Milwaukee. He succeeded Archbishop Timothy Dolan, who was transferred to New York. Listecki was installed in Milwaukee on January 4, 2010.

Pope Benedict XVI appointed Auxiliary bishop William P. Callahan of the Archdiocese of Milwaukee as Bishop of La Crosse by on June 11, 2010. He was installed on August 11, 2010.

The diocese today

The diocese has 108 parishes with a resident pastor and 57 without a resident pastor. There are 177 diocesan priests incardinated in the diocese, while another 15 priests belong to various religious institutes. In December 2012, 32 seminarians were studying to enter the priesthood of the diocese. There are also four religious brothers, 31 permanent deacons, five hermits and three consecrated virgins.  A total of 447 religious sisters belong mainly to two large religious institutes: the Sisters of St. Joseph of the Third Order of St. Francis in Stevens Point and the Franciscan Sisters of Perpetual Adoration in La Crosse. Other active religious are the Franciscan Friars of the Immaculate in La Crosse, Capuchins in Marathon, and the Cistercians in Sparta. The Sisters of St Francis of the Martyr St George also have a convent in La Crosse.

Allegations of sexual abuse
In May 2019, Msgr. Bernard McGarty was arrested and charged with fourth degree sexual assault for allegedly groping a woman outside the La Crosse Public Library. The case was later dismissed, the District Attorney citing "McGarty’s age (95) and his current health problems indicate he is not likely to repeat this behavior and given the lengthy delay caused by the COVID-19 pandemic the State feels it is not necessary to pursue this case".

In June 2020, Fr. Charlie Richmond, who served as a high school chaplain in Chippewa Falls, was charged with sexually assaulting a female minor while serving at McDonell Area Catholic School between September 2016 and May 2017. Richmond was then suspended from active ministry.

Bishops
The following are lists of the Roman Catholic Bishops and Auxiliary Bishops of the Diocese of La Crosse and their years of service.

Bishops of La Crosse
 Michael Heiss (1868–1880), appointed Archbishop of Milwaukee
 Kilian Caspar Flasch (1881–1891)
 James Schwebach (1891–1921)
 Alexander Joseph McGavick (1921–1948)
 John Patrick Treacy (1948–1964)
 Frederick William Freking (1965–1983)
 John Joseph Paul (1983–1994)
 Raymond Leo Burke (1995–2004), appointed Archbishop of St. Louis and later Prefect of the Apostolic Signatura and Patron of the Order of Malta (elevated to Cardinal in 2010)
 Jerome Edward Listecki (2004–2010), appointed Archbishop of Milwaukee
 William P. Callahan (2010–present)

Auxiliary bishops
 William Richard Griffin (1935–1944)
 John Joseph Paul (1977–1983), appointed Bishop of La Crosse

Other priests of this diocese who became bishops
 Robert Herman Flock, appointed Auxiliary Bishop of Cochabamba in 2012 and later Bishop of San Ignacio de Velasco
 George Albert Hammes, appointed Bishop of Superior in 1960

Diocesan institutions
Among the institutions in the Diocese of La Crosse are 10 Catholic-affiliated hospitals; Viterbo University, which enrolls 2,167 students; St. Rose of Viterbo Convent, the motherhouse of the Franciscan Sisters of Perpetual Adoration, and the Shrine of Our Lady of Guadalupe in La Crosse. The first Mass was held at the Shrine on July 31, 2008. Prairie du Chien was home to the Jesuit-run Campion High School until its closing in 1975.

High schools
 Aquinas High School, La Crosse
 Assumption High School, Wisconsin Rapids
 Columbus Catholic High School, Marshfield
 McDonell Central Catholic High School, Chippewa Falls
 Newman Catholic High School, Wausau
 Pacelli High School, Stevens Point
 Regis High School, Eau Claire

Elementary/middle schools
The diocese's 74 elementary schools enroll 8,717 students per year.

Pacelli Catholic Schools
Pacelli Catholic Schools is a private, PreK-12 Catholic school system located in Stevens Point, Wisconsin.  A consolidation of 6 parish schools, the includes one early childhood center (preschool), two elementary schools (grades K-4), one middle school (grades 5-8), and one high school (grades 9-12). Pacelli Catholic Schools is supported by seven local parishes: St. Bronislava; St. Joseph; St. Stanislaus Kostka; St. Stephens; St. Peters; Newman; St. Mary (Immaculate Conception) of Torun.

Former high schools
 Campion High School, Prairie du Chien, (closed in 1975)
 Madonna High School, Mauston (closed in 1966)

Publications
The Diocese of La Crosse published a bi-weekly newspaper, The Catholic Times, until 2015. The Diocese continues to publish the Catholic Life magazine in print and online.

See also

 List of the Catholic dioceses of the United States
 List of Roman Catholic dioceses (alphabetical)
 List of Roman Catholic dioceses (structured view)
 Necedah Shrine

References

Further reading 
 Fisher, Gerald Edward. 257 Things You Should Know About the Diocese of La Crosse: A Celebration of the Diocese of La Crosse: 125 Years - 1968-1993: Bishop John J. Paul 50th Anniversary of Priestly Ordination: 1943-1993, 1993.
 Fisher, Gerald Edward. Dusk Is My Dawn: The First Hundred Years of the Diocese of La Crosse, 1969.
 Ludwig, M. Mileta. Right Hand Uplifted: A Biography of Archbishop Michael Heiss, Franciscan Sisters of Perpetual Adoration, 1968.
 Brickl, Frank. Brickbats & Bouquets: Memories of a Parish Priest. 1990. (Information about the personalities of the Bishops of La Crosse from Bishop McGavick to Bishop Freking.)

External links
Roman Catholic Diocese of La Crosse Official Site
Shrine of Our Lady of Guadalupe
The Cathedral of St. Joseph the Workman
The Sisters of St. Francis of the Martyr St. George  Alton, Illinois

 
Religious organizations established in 1868
La Crosse
La Crosse